2011 Israeli middle class protests may refer to:
 The cottage cheese boycott – a massive consumer boycott held in Israel in June 2011 in protest of the spike in food prices, which led to significant price reductions of cottage cheese and cream cheese.
 2011 Israeli social justice protests – a series of demonstrations in Israel beginning in July 2011 involving hundreds of thousands of protesters from a variety of socio-economic and religious backgrounds opposing the continuing rise in the cost of living in Israel, and particularly the relatively high housing prices in Israel as well as the lack of affordable housing solutions in the country. They have evolved into wider claims for social justice.

External links
 Israel's secular middle class strikes back - published on The Guardian on 2 August 2011
 The Loud Awakening of Israel's Secular Middle Class - published on The Atlantic on 8 August 2011
 Thousands of Israeli doctors, residents protest in Jerusalem - published on Haaretz on 31 July 2011

2011 Israeli social justice protests
Protests in Israel